Events from the year 1966 in Canada.

Incumbents

Crown 
 Monarch – Elizabeth II

Federal government 
 Governor General – Georges Vanier
 Prime Minister – Lester B. Pearson
 Chief Justice – Robert Taschereau (Quebec)
 Parliament – 27th

Provincial governments

Lieutenant governors 
Lieutenant Governor of Alberta – John Percy Page (until January 6) then Grant MacEwan  
Lieutenant Governor of British Columbia – George Pearkes 
Lieutenant Governor of Manitoba – Richard Spink Bowles 
Lieutenant Governor of New Brunswick – John B. McNair 
Lieutenant Governor of Newfoundland – Fabian O'Dea 
Lieutenant Governor of Nova Scotia – Henry Poole MacKeen  
Lieutenant Governor of Ontario – William Earl Rowe 
Lieutenant Governor of Prince Edward Island – Willibald Joseph MacDonald 
Lieutenant Governor of Quebec – Paul Comtois (until February 22) then Hugues Lapointe 
Lieutenant Governor of Saskatchewan – Robert Hanbidge

Premiers 
Premier of Alberta – Ernest Manning   
Premier of British Columbia – W.A.C. Bennett 
Premier of Manitoba – Dufferin Roblin  
Premier of New Brunswick – Louis Robichaud 
Premier of Newfoundland – Joey Smallwood 
Premier of Nova Scotia – Robert Stanfield 
Premier of Ontario – John Robarts 
Premier of Prince Edward Island – Walter Shaw (until July 28) then Alexander B. Campbell 
Premier of Quebec – Jean Lesage (until June 16) then Daniel Johnson, Sr. 
Premier of Saskatchewan – Ross Thatcher

Territorial governments

Commissioners 
 Commissioner of Yukon – Gordon Robertson Cameron (until November 7) then James Smith 
 Commissioner of Northwest Territories – Bent Gestur Sivertz

Events
January 1: The Canada Pension Plan and the Quebec Pension Plan both begin operation
February 25: Toronto Transit Commission inaugurates the Bloor-Danforth Subway line.
March 4: The Munsinger Affair is Canada's first major political sex scandal
May 1: Army camps, RCAF stations, and the RCN's land-based installations become Canadian Forces bases. Training schools and the pay system are unified.
May 18: Paul Joseph Chartier is killed when a bomb he is carrying goes off on Parliament Hill
June 5: The Union Nationale under Daniel Johnson, Sr. is elected in Quebec.

June 16: Daniel Johnson, Sr., becomes premier of Quebec, replacing Jean Lesage
July 28: Alexander B. Campbell becomes premier of Prince Edward Island, replacing Walter Shaw
September 1: The CBC becomes the first Canadian television network to broadcast in colour, followed within days by the private-sector CTV Television Network.
October 14: Montreal inaugurates its metro system (see Montreal Metro).
October 17: The Montreal Metro opens
November 4: Bill C-243, The Canadian Forces Reorganization Act, is introduced in Parliament.
December 31: The Centennial Flame in front of Parliament Hill is lit
The Revolutionary Strategy and the Role of the Avant-Garde outlining the strategy of the FLQ is written.
The Seasonal Agricultural Workers Program is established.
The Medical Care Act is passed, helping set up the Medicare system

Unknown
The Glenbow Museum opens in Calgary.

Arts and literature

New works
Cold Mountain. Singing Hands Series 3 by B. P. Nichol
The Circle Game by Margaret Atwood
Expeditions by Margaret Atwood
Speeches for Doctor Frankenstein by Margaret Atwood
Beautiful Losers by Leonard Cohen

Awards
See 1966 Governor General's Awards for a complete list of winners and finalists for those awards.
Stephen Leacock Award: George Bain, Nursery Rhymes to Be Read Aloud by Young Parents with Old Children
Vicky Metcalf Award: Fred Savage

Music
March 3: Canadian Neil Young, joins Stephen Stills and Richie Furay to form Buffalo Springfield.

Television
 Star Trek premieres starring Montreal actor William Shatner

Sports
January 7 – Gene Kiniski wins his first (and only) NWA World Heavyweight Championship title by defeating Lou Thesz. Kiniski becomes the third Canadian to win the NWA title
March 5 – The Toronto Varsity Blues win their first University Cup by defeating the Alberta Golden Bears 8–1, The final game was played at Sudbury Community Arena
March 12 – Bobby Hull sets the record for the most goals in a National Hockey League (NHL) season.
May 5 – The Montreal Canadiens win their 14th Stanley Cup by defeating the Detroit Red Wings 4 games to 2. Bracebridge, Ontario's Roger Crozier won the Conn Smythe Trophy in a losing effort.
May 15 – The Central Alberta Hockey League's Edmonton Oil Kings win their second Memorial Cup by defeating the Ontario Hockey Association's Oshawa Generals 4 games 2. All games were played Maple Leaf Gardens in Toronto
November 19 – The St. Francis Xavier X-Men win their first Vanier Cup by defeating the Waterloo Lutheran Golden Hawks 40–14 in the 2nd Vanier Cup played at Varsity Stadium in Toronto
November 26 – The Saskatchewan Roughriders win their first Grey Cup by defeating the Ottawa Rough Riders 29–14 in the 54th Grey Cup played at Empire Stadium in Vancouver

Births

January to March
January 2 – James Cantor, clinical psychologist and sexologist
January 14 – Rene Simpson, tennis player (d. 2013)
January 23 – Bernadette Bowyer, field hockey player
January 24 – Michael Forgeron, rower and Olympic gold medallist
January 30 – Doug Wood, pole vaulter
February 17 – Luc Robitaille, ice hockey player
February 20 – Louis Ferreira, actor
February 27 – Donal Logue, actor
March 1 – Susan Auch, speed skater and double Olympic silver medallist
March 16 – Chrissy Redden, cyclist
March 20 – Chris Gifford, field hockey player
March 25 – Jeff Healey, jazz and blues-rock guitarist and vocalist (d. 2008)
March 25 – David Hohl, wrestler
March 29 – Pamela Rai, Olympic swimmer
March 31 – Nathalie Gosselin, judoka

April to June
April 14 – André Boisclair, politician
April 15 – Beverly Thomson, television personality, journalist, and correspondent for CTV Television Network
April 19 – David La Haye, actor
April 20 – Vincent Riendeau, ice hockey player and coach
April 24 – David Usher, rock singer-songwriter
May 2 – Belinda Stronach, politician and Minister, businessperson and philanthropist
May 11 – Michelle MacPherson, swimmer and Olympic bronze medallist
May 12 – Anne Ottenbrite, swimmer and Olympic gold medallist
May 23 – Gary Roberts, ice hockey player
June 5 – Dwayne Hill, voice actor
June 12 – Michael Redhill, poet, playwright and novelist
June 18 – Kurt Browning, figure skater and four-time World Champion, choreographer
June 24 – Debbie Fuller, diver
June 26 – Kirk McLean, ice hockey player
June 29 – John Part, darts player
June 30 – Peter Outerbridge, actor

July to September
August 3 – Brent Butt, comedian and TV producer
August 27 – Gianni Vignaduzzi, track cyclist
September 10 – Joe Nieuwendyk, ice hockey player and manager
September 27 – Gerry Byrne, politician

October to December

October 17 – Peter Milkovich, field hockey player and coach
October 24 – Conrad Pla, kickboxer and actor
October 25 – Wendel Clark, ice hockey player
November 8 – Michael Soles, footballer (d. 2021)
November 9 – Lisa Faust, field hockey player
November 11 –  Peaches, musician
November 14 – André Gingras, dancer and choreographer (d. 2013)
November 16 – Dean McDermott, Canadian-American actor
November 21 – Christopher Bowie, swimmer
December 1 – Larry Walker, baseball player
December 5 – Deb Whitten, field hockey player
December 10 – Dana Murzyn, ice hockey player 
December 14 – Bill Ranford, ice hockey player  
December 21 – Kiefer Sutherland, actor

Full date unknown
Stéphane Demers, actor

Deaths
January 22 – Morris Gray, politician (b.1889)
February 6 - R.T.M. Scott, author
April 8 – Robert Methven Petrie, astronomer (b.1906)
July 11 – Andrew McNaughton, army officer, politician and diplomat (b.1887)
September 5 – William Murdoch Buchanan, politician (b.1897)
September 10 – Blodwen Davies, writer (b.1897)
September 15 – Leonard Brockington, lawyer, civil servant and first head of the Canadian Broadcasting Corporation (CBC) (b.1888)
October 18 – Elizabeth Arden, businesswoman (b.1884 in Canada)
December 2 - Ralph Allen, author and journalist

See also
 1966 in Canadian television
 List of Canadian films

References

 
Years of the 20th century in Canada
Canada
1966 in North America